In mathematics, more specifically ring theory, the Jacobson radical of a ring  is the ideal consisting of those elements in  that annihilate all simple right -modules. It happens that substituting "left" in place of "right" in the definition yields the same ideal, and so the notion is left-right symmetric.

The Jacobson radical of a ring has numerous internal characterizations, including a few definitions that successfully extend the notion to rings without unity. The radical of a module extends the definition of the Jacobson radical to include modules. The Jacobson radical plays a prominent role in many ring and module theoretic results, such as Nakayama's lemma.

Definitions 
There are multiple equivalent definitions and characterizations of the Jacobson radical, but it is useful to consider the definitions based on if the ring is commutative or not.

Commutative case 
In the commutative case, the Jacobson radical of a commutative ring  is defined as the intersection of all maximal ideals . If we denote  as the set of all maximal ideals in  thenThis definition can be used for explicit calculations in a number of simple cases, such as for local rings , which have a unique maximal ideal, Artin rings, and products thereof. See the examples section for explicit computations.

Noncommutative/general case 
For a general ring with unity , the Jacobson radical  is defined as the ideal of all elements  such that  whenever  is a simple -module.

Motivation 
Understanding the Jacobson radical lies in a few different cases: namely its applications and the resulting geometric interpretations, and its algebraic interpretations.

Geometric applications 

Although Jacobson originally introduced his radical as a technique for building a theory of radicals for arbitrary rings, one of the motivating reasons for why the Jacobson radical is considered in the commutative case is because of Nakayama's lemma.

Another application is in the case of finitely generated commutative rings, meaning  is of the formfor some base ring  (such as a field, or the ring of integers). In this case the nilradical and the Jacobson radical coincide. This means we could interpret the Jacobson radical as a measure for how far the ideal  defining the ring  is from defining the ring of functions on an algebraic variety because of the Hilbert Nullstellensatz theorem. This is because algebraic varieties cannot have a ring of functions with infinitesimals: this is a structure which is only considered in scheme theory.

Equivalent characterizations 
The Jacobson radical of a ring has various internal and external characterizations.

The following are equivalent characterizations of the Jacobson radical in rings with unity (characterizations for rings without unity are given immediately afterward):

  equals the intersection of all maximal right ideals of the ring. The equivalence coming from the fact that for all maximal right ideals M, R/M is a simple right R-module, and that in fact all simple right R-modules are isomorphic to one of this type via the map from R to S given by r ↦ xr for any generator x of S. It is also true that  equals the intersection of all maximal left ideals within the ring. These characterizations are internal to the ring, since one only needs to find the maximal right ideals of the ring. For example, if a ring is local, and has a unique maximal right ideal, then this unique maximal right ideal is exactly . Maximal ideals are in a sense easier to look for than annihilators of modules. The left-right symmetry of these two definitions is remarkable and has various interesting consequences. This symmetry stands in contrast to the lack of symmetry in the socles of R, for it may happen that soc(RR) is not equal to soc(RR). If R is a non-commutative ring,  is not necessarily equal to the intersection of all maximal two-sided ideals of R. For instance, if V is a countable direct sum of copies of a field k and R = End(V) (the ring of endomorphisms of V as a k-module), then  because  is known to be von Neumann regular, but there is exactly one maximal double-sided ideal in R consisting of endomorphisms with finite-dimensional image. 
  equals the sum of all superfluous right ideals (or symmetrically, the sum of all superfluous left ideals) of R. Comparing this with the previous definition, the sum of superfluous right ideals equals the intersection of maximal right ideals.  This phenomenon is reflected dually for the right socle of R; soc(RR) is both the sum of minimal right ideals and the intersection of essential right ideals.  In fact, these two relationships hold for the radicals and socles of modules in general.
 As defined in the introduction,  equals the intersection of all annihilators of simple right R-modules, however it is also true that it is the intersection of annihilators of simple left modules. An ideal that is the annihilator of a simple module is known as a primitive ideal, and so a reformulation of this states that the Jacobson radical is the intersection of all primitive ideals.  This characterization is useful when studying modules over rings. For instance, if U is a right R-module, and V is a maximal submodule of U, U · J(R) is contained in V, where U · J(R) denotes all products of elements of J(R) (the "scalars") with elements in U, on the right. This follows from the fact that the quotient module U/V is simple and hence annihilated by J(R).
 J(R) is the unique right ideal of R maximal with the property that every element is right quasiregular (or equivalently left quasiregular). This characterization of the Jacobson radical is useful both computationally and in aiding intuition. Furthermore, this characterization is useful in studying modules over a ring. Nakayama's lemma is perhaps the most well-known instance of this. Although every element of the J(R) is necessarily quasiregular, not every quasiregular element is necessarily a member of J(R).
  is the set of elements x in R such that every element of 1 + RxR is a unit: . In fact,  is in the Jacobson radical if and only if 1 + xy is invertible for any , if and only if 1 + yx is invertible for any .

For rings without unity it is possible for R = J(R); however, the equation J(R/J(R)) = {0} still holds.  The following are equivalent characterizations of J(R) for rings without unity :
 The notion of left quasiregularity can be generalized in the following way.  Call an element a in R left generalized quasiregular if there exists c in R such that c+a−ca = 0.  Then J(R) consists of every element a for which ra is left generalized quasiregular for all r in R.  It can be checked that this definition coincides with the previous quasiregular definition for rings with unity.
 For a ring without unity, the definition of a left simple module M is amended by adding the condition that R • M ≠ 0.  With this understanding, J(R) may be defined as the intersection of all annihilators of simple left R modules, or just R if there are no simple left R modules.  Rings without unity with no simple modules do exist, in which case R = J(R), and the ring is called a radical ring.  By using the generalized quasiregular characterization of the radical, it is clear that if one finds a ring with J(R) nonzero, then J(R) is a radical ring when considered as a ring without unity.

Examples

Commutative examples 

 For the ring of integers  its Jacobson radical is the zero ideal, so , because it is given by the intersection of every ideal generated by a prime number . Since , and we are taking an infinite intersection with no common elements besides  between all maximal ideals, we have the computation.
 For a local ring  the Jacobson radical is simply . This is an important case because of its use in applying Nakayama's lemma.
 The previous example could be extended to the ring , giving .
 The Jacobson radical of the ring Z/12Z is 6Z/12Z, which is the intersection of the maximal ideals 2Z/12Z and 3Z/12Z.

Noncommutative examples 
 Rings for which J(R) is {0} are called semiprimitive rings, or sometimes "Jacobson semisimple rings".  The Jacobson radical of any field, any von Neumann regular ring and any left or right primitive ring  is {0}. The Jacobson radical of the integers is {0}.
 If K is a field and R is the ring of all upper triangular n-by-n matrices with entries in K, then J(R) consists of all upper triangular matrices with zeros on the main diagonal.
 Start with a finite, acyclic quiver Γ and a field K and consider the quiver algebra KΓ (as described in the Quiver article). The Jacobson radical of this ring is generated by all the paths in Γ of length ≥ 1.
  The Jacobson radical of a C*-algebra is {0}. This follows from the Gelfand–Naimark theorem and the fact that for a C*-algebra, a topologically irreducible *-representation on a Hilbert space is algebraically irreducible, so that its kernel is a primitive ideal in the purely algebraic sense (see Spectrum of a C*-algebra).

Properties
 If R is unital and is not the trivial ring {0}, the Jacobson radical is always distinct from R since rings with unity always have maximal right ideals. However, some important theorems and conjectures in ring theory consider the case when J(R) = R - "If R is a nil ring (that is, each of its elements is nilpotent), is the polynomial ring R[x] equal to its Jacobson radical?" is equivalent to the open Köthe conjecture. 
 For any ideal I contained in J(R), 
 J(R / I) = J(R) / I.
 In particular, the Jacobson radical of the ring R/J(R) is zero. Rings with zero Jacobson radical are called semiprimitive rings. 
 A ring is semisimple if and only if it is Artinian and its Jacobson radical is zero.
 If f : R → S is a surjective ring homomorphism, then f(J(R)) ⊆ J(S).
 If R is a ring with unity and M is a finitely generated left R-module with J(R)M = M, then M = 0 (Nakayama's lemma).
 J(R) contains all central nilpotent elements, but contains no idempotent elements except for 0.
 J(R) contains every nil ideal of R. If R is left or right Artinian, then J(R) is a nilpotent ideal.This can actually be made stronger: If  is a composition series for the right R-module R (such a series is sure to exist if R is right Artinian, and there is a similar left composition series if R is left Artinian), then  Note, however, that in general the Jacobson radical need not consist of only the nilpotent elements of the ring.
 If R is commutative and finitely generated as an algebra over either a field or Z, then J(R) is equal to the nilradical of R.
The Jacobson radical of a (unital) ring is its largest superfluous right (equivalently, left) ideal.

See also
Frattini subgroup
Nilradical
Radical of a module
Radical of an ideal

Notes

References

Bourbaki, N. Éléments de mathématique.
 Reprint of the 1968 original;   With an afterword by Lance W. Small
 
 

 Studies in the History of Modern Science, 9

External links 

 Intuitive Example of a Jacobson Radical

Ideals (ring theory)
Ring theory